Bio-geoengineering is a form of climate engineering which seeks to use or modify plants or other living things to modify the Earth's climate.

Bio-energy with carbon storage, afforestation projects, and ocean nourishment (including iron fertilization) could be considered examples of bio-geoengineering.

Biogenic aerosols can be grown to replace those beneficial aerosols lost as the result of the death of 50% of Earth's boreal forests. Agricultural production of atmospheric aerosols called "monoterpenes" is possible if crops that are rich in monoterpenes are grown.

Introduction
Geoengineering is conventionally split into two broad categories. Carbon geoengineering tries to expel carbon dioxide from the environment, which would address the underlying driver of environmental change — the collection of carbon dioxide in the climate. In the chain from outflows to focuses to temperatures to impacts, it breaks the connection from discharges to fixations. Sun powered geoengineering tries to mirror a little part of daylight once more into space or increment the measure of sun oriented radiation that escapes once again into space to cool the planet. Rather than carbon geoengineering, sun based geoengineering does not address the underlying driver of environmental change. It rather expects to break the connection from fixations to temperatures, along these lines diminishing some atmosphere harms.
The quick increment in the centralization of air CO2  proceeded with anthropogenic emanations of this gas is the fundamental factor driving worldwide environmental change. Due to many different causes global temperatures are to increase by 3-5 degrees celsius or 5.4 - 9 degrees fahrenheit within this century.

Bio-geoengineering solutions to climate change

Carbon capture and storage.
The CO2 is ordinarily caught before the emissions leave the smokestack, for the most part with a sorbent concoction. The liquified CO2 is then siphoned into underground aquifers for long haul storage.

Removal of atmospheric CO2 - Synthetic trees 

Sorbents catch CO2 from free-streaming air and discharge those atoms as an unadulterated stream of carbon dioxide for sequestration.

100 m2 can extract about 1000 tons of carbon dioxide from the atmosphere

11 million devices would be required to remove 11 billion tons of carbon dioxide

Stratospheric aerosols. Amid major volcanic ejections, the Earth regularly experiences huge cooling because of sulfur shot out into the stratosphere. Paul Crutzen, a Dutch chemist, proposed creating a 'blanket' of sulphur that would block the Sun's rays from reaching Earth.

Seeding the atmosphere to increase reflection of sunlight is also a solution however such approaches are still not being adopted since they have not been  proven feasible and have many social, economic, and technical issues before they could be widely adopted.

Downside of bio-geoengineering
Mirroring the sun's beams into space would modify precipitation designs and reforesting the deserts could change wind designs and could even lessen tree development in different regions. If we are not able to sustain such technology many wildlife can possibly die due to the rapid change in the earth's climate.

References

Agriculture
Biological engineering
Climate engineering